Shidacang Township (Mandarin: 石大仓乡) is a township in Hualong Hui Autonomous County, Haidong, Qinghai, China. In 2010, Shidacang Township had a total population of 5,721: 2,896 males and 2,825 females:1,654 aged under 14, 3,687 aged between 15 and 65 and 380 aged over 65.

References 

Haidong
Township-level divisions of Qinghai